Miami Ink was an American reality show that ran on TLC  from 2005–2008 and follows the events that took place at a tattoo shop in Miami Beach, Florida. The show led to several spin-offs, including the shows LA Ink, London Ink, NY Ink, and Madrid Ink, most of which were also broadcast on TLC.

History
The shop, which opened in 2004, was called 305 Ink (referencing a Miami area code) before the show started. Later changed to Love Hate Tattoo, it is co-owned by tattoo artists Ami James and Chris Núñez, and at the time of the show, also featured artists Chris Garver, Darren Brass, Luke Wessman, Morgan Pennypacker, Tim Hendricks and Yoji Harada.

Kat Von D joined the shop during the show's first season while Brass had an injured arm. She then returned as a full-time crew member for three seasons, after which she moved to Los Angeles and landed her own Miami Ink spin-off, LA Ink, which premiered in August 2007. The first 6 episodes of Miami Ink were directed by David Roma, an influential member of creating the format. 

Each episode featured multiple customers and detailed their backstories and motivations for choosing their tattoos. In addition, there was some focus on the personal lives of the artists. Most of the episodes are narrated by James, with Núñez occasionally filling in.

The main musical theme for the show is "Funky Kingston" by Toots & the Maytals. The show has on occasion featured such guests as Paul Teutul Sr. from American Chopper.

NY Ink

Since Miami Ink went off air, James moved to New York City in 2011 and opened a tattoo studio there, named the Wooster St. Social Club. He teamed up with David Roma and Charlie Corwin to detail the proceedings in the shop on NY Ink, which premiered June 2, 2011 on TLC.

Celebrity customers
 Frank Iero MCR Guitarist 
 Brantley Gilbert, Country Singer
 A.B. Quintanilla, Mexican-American musician and producer
 Anthony Bourdain, celebrity chef
 Bam Margera, professional skateboarder and actor
 Chris Jacobs, host of TLC's Overhaulin'
 Craig Ferguson, actor and comedian
 DJ Skribble, DJ
 Evan Seinfeld, vocalist for Biohazard and adult film star
 Gianna Lynn, adult film star
 H2O, band
 Harold Hunter, skateboarder
 Irvin Mayfield, Trumpetuer
 Ivy Supersonic, fashion designer
 Jesse Hughes, musician of Eagles of Death Metal
 Joe Hursley, Lead Singer of The Ringers
 Johnny Messner, actor
 Leo Nocentelli, Guitarist for The Meters
 Lloyd Banks, rapper
 Mark Zupan, athlete
 MickDeth, bassist for Eighteen Visions
 Monica Martin, bodybuilder
 Mr. J. Medeiros, Emcee/Producer
 Paul Teutul Sr., Owner of Orange County Choppers American Chopper
 Paula Meronek, TV personality from The Real World: Key West
 Phil Varone, drummer of Skid Row and Saigon Kick
 Reginald 'Fieldy' Arvizu, bassist for Korn
 Roger Miret, vocalist for Agnostic Front
 Sunny Garcia, pro surfer
 Syrus Yarbrough, TV personality from The Real World: Boston

Episode list 

Season 1 (10 episodes)
 Season 1 Episode 1 - Five Friends (Prem. 7/19/05)
 Season 1 Episode 2 - Never Forget (Prem. 7/26/05)
 Season 1 Episode 3 - In Memory Of… (Prem. 8/2/05)
 Season 1 Episode 4 - Growing Up (Prem. 8/9/05)
 Season 1 Episode 5 - The Apprentice (Prem. 8/16/05)
 Season 1 Episode 6 - The Family (Prem. 8/23/05)
 Season 1 Episode 7 - Going For The Gold (Prem. 9/6/05)
 Season 1 Episode 8 - Bad Break (Prem. 9/13/05)
 Season 1 Episode 9 - Kat's In The Groove (Prem. 9/20/05)
 Season 1 Episode 10 - Finding Balance (Prem. 9/27/05)

Season 2 (11 episodes)
 Season 2 Episode 11 - More Money, More Problems (Prem. 1/10/06)
 Season 2 Episode 12 - Step up or Step Out (Prem. 1/17/06)
 Season 2 Episode 13 - Weathering The Storm (Prem. 1/31/06)
 Season 2 Episode 14 - Party All The Time (Prem. 1/24/06)
 Season 2 Episode 15 - Kat's Return, Ami's Ride (Prem. 2/7/06)
 Season 2 Episode 16 - The Ink That Binds (Prem. 3/14/06)
 Season 2 Episode 17 - While Ami's Away...(Prem. 2/28/06)
 Season 2 Episode 18 - Rock 'n' Roll All Night (Prem. 3/7/06)
 Season 2 Episode 19 - Goodbye Freedom (Prem. 4/4/06)
 Season 2 Episode 20 - Made In Japan (Prem. 4/11/06)
 Season 2 Episode 21 - Hawaii (Prem. 1/8/06)

Season 3 (13 episodes)
 Season 3 Episode 1 - Yoji's Initiation (Prem. 7/25/06)
 Season 3 Episode 2 - Saver or Spender (Prem. 7/18/06)
 Season 3 Episode 3 - Woman In a Man's World (Prem. 8/1/06)
 Season 3 Episode 4 - The Ultimate Job Interview (Prem. 8/8/06)
 Season 3 Episode 5 - We're All Family (Prem. 8/15/06)
 Season 3 Episode 6 - Kat The Party Machine (Prem. 8/22/06)
 Season 3 Episode 7 - Garver's Ultimatum (Prem. 8/29/06)
 Season 3 Episode 8 - Kat: A Fish Out Of Water (Prem. 9/5/06)
 Season 3 Episode 9 - Ami's Bad Side (Prem. 9/12/06)
 Season 3 Episode 10 - Kat's Niche (Prem. 9/19/06)
 Season 3 Episode 11 - Lloyd Banks and the Rotten Apple (Prem. 10/10/06)
 Season 3 Episode 12 - Kat & Ami Tattoo The Troops (Prem. 10/17/06)
 Season 3 Episode 13 - Bye-Bye Bridgette (Prem. 10/24/06)

Season 4 (20 episodes)
 Season 4 Episode 1 - Sink Or Swim (Prem. 10/31/06)
 Season 4 Episode 2 - The Jeep (Prem. 11/07/06)
 Season 4 Episode 3 - History Of The Circus Sideshow (Prem. 11/28/06)
 Season 4 Episode 4 - A Disgruntled Yoji (Prem. 12/5/06)
 Season 4 Episode 5 - Von D Family Bonding (Prem. 12/12/06)
 Season 4 Episode 6 - The Car Star (Prem. 12/19/06)
 Season 4 Episode 7 - Garver's Injury (Prem. 12/26/06)
 Season 4 Episode 8 - Battle Of The Apprentices (Prem. 1/23/07)
 Season 4 Episode 9 - Shop Party (Prem. 1/30/07)
 Season 4 Episode 10 - Yoji's Big Move (Prem. 2/6/07)
 Season 4 Episode 11 - Family Values Tour (Prem. 2/13/07)
 Season 4 Episode 12 - Nobody Likes a Quitter (Prem. 2/27/07)
 Season 4 Episode 13 - Bella Boot Camp (Prem. 3/6/07)
 Season 4 Episode 14 - Kat and Oliver Quality Time (Prem. 3/13/07)
 Season 4 Episode 15 - Back To Their Roots (Prem. 3/20/07)
 Season 4 Episode 16 - Kat's Cooking (Prem. 3/27/07)
 Season 4 Episode 17 - Yoji's Dilemma (Prem. 4/3/07)
 Season 4 Episode 18 - American Chopper (Prem. 5/1/07)
 Season 4 Episode 19 - Ami and Nunez Buy A Bar (Prem. 4/24/07)
 Season 4 Episode 20 - Tensions Rock The Shop (Prem. 5/8/07)

Season 5 (13 episodes)
 Season 5 Episode 1 - New Artist Search (Prem. 6/12/07)
 Season 5 Episode 2 - Staff, Staff, Staff (Prem. 6/19/07)
 Season 5 Episode 3 - Old Friends (Prem. 6/26/07)
 Season 5 Episode 4 - Facing Changes (Prem. 7/3/07)
 Season 5 Episode 5 - Garver Gets Commissioned (Prem. 7/17/07)
 Season 5 Episode 6 - Viva Las Vegas (Prem. 7/24/07)
 Season 5 Episode 7 - Nothing Lasts Forever (Prem. 7/31/07)
 Season 5 Episode 8 - No Regrets (Prem. 11/6/07)
 Season 5 Episode 9 - Ami's Anger (Prem. 11/13/07)
 Season 5 Episode 10 - Skate Or Die (Prem. 11/20/07)
 Season 5 Episode 11 - Speed Racer (Prem. 11/27/07)
 Season 5 Episode 12 - Makin' The Big Leagues (Prem. 12/4/07)
 Season 5 Episode 13 - Through Thick and Thin (Prem. 12/11/07)

Season 6 (13 episodes)
 Season 6 Episode 1 - Make or Break (Prem. 4/24/08)
 Season 6 Episode 2 - We Are Family (Prem. 5/1/08)
 Season 6 Episode 3 - Tim's Pinups (Prem. 5/8/08)
 Season 6 Episode 4 - House Hunting (Prem. 5/15/08)
 Season 6 Episode 5 - Ami Animates (Prem. 5/22/08)
 Season 6 Episode 6 - Blast Off! (Prem. 6/5/08)
 Season 6 Episode 7 - Dre's Stylin' (Prem. 6/12/08)
 Season 6 Episode 8 - Ami and Yoji Come To Blows (Prem. 7/3/08)
 Season 6 Episode 9 - Dre Demands Respect (Prem. 7/10/08)
 Season 6 Episode 10 - Ruthless and Toothless (Prem. 7/24/08)
 Season 6 Episode 11 - New Orleans Special (Prem. 8/7/08)
 Season 6 Episode 12 - Hanging With The Harada's (Prem. 8/14/08)
 Season 6 Episode 13 - A Baby Makes Three (Prem. 8/21/08)

International screenings

Miami Ink has been shown mainly on channels of the Discovery Network, including Discovery Real Time (UK, Ireland, France, Italy), the Discovery Channel (Norway, Poland, Denmark, Romania, Finland, The Netherlands, South Africa, Namibia, Belgium, Turkey, Portugal, Czech, Spain), DMAX (UK, Italy, Ireland and Germany), Discovery Travel and Living (Croatia, India, Italy, Russia, Serbia, Indonesia, Australia, New Zealand, Poland, Romania, Bulgaria, Hungary, Macedonia, Denmark, Singapore, Portugal, Hong Kong) and TLC (Latin America, Spain and Brazil). It has also been broadcast by Viasat 4 (Norway), TV6 (Sweden), TV3+ (Denmark), Numéro 23 (France) and Jim (Finland).

See also
David Roma
List of tattoo TV shows

References

External links
 
 
 Exclusive Interview With Yoji Harada
 Luke Wessman. 

2005 American television series debuts
2008 American television series endings
2000s American reality television series
Culture of Miami
English-language television shows
Television series set in tattoo shops
Television shows set in Miami
TLC (TV network) original programming